Domin or Demin ( or Демин)  is a Russian masculine surname, its feminine counterpart is Domina or Demina. It may refer to
Alexander Demin (born 1988), Russian politician
Eduard Dyomin (born 1974), Russian football manager and former player 
Ekaterina Mikhailova-Demina (1925–2019), Russian front-line reconnaissance officer
Julia Demina (born 1969), Russian chess player
Lev Dyomin (1926–1998), Russian cosmonaut 
Maxim Demin, Russian businessman
Oleh Domin (born 1947), Ukrainian ambassador
Svetlana Demina (born 1961), Russian sport shooter
Victor Dyomin (1937–1993), Russian cinema critic, editor and screenwriter
Vladimir Dyomin (1921–1966), Russian football player and football coach
Vyacheslav Dyomin (footballer, born 1968), Russian football player

See also
5086 Demin

Russian-language surnames